Drive time may refer to:
Drive time, a part of the day in which many radio listeners are driving
DriveTime, a used car seller and automobile finance company
"Drive Time" (song), a 1993 song by Lisa Stewart 
The Drivetime, a 1995 science fiction film